Julio Guzman (born 4 June 1957) is a Puerto Rican boxer. He competed in the men's flyweight event at the 1976 Summer Olympics. At the 1976 Summer Olympics, he lost in his first fight to Fazlija Šaćirović of Yugoslavia.

References

1957 births
Living people
Puerto Rican male boxers
Olympic boxers of Puerto Rico
Boxers at the 1976 Summer Olympics
Place of birth missing (living people)
Flyweight boxers
20th-century Puerto Rican people